Silver Creek is a stream in the U.S. state of Indiana. It is a tributary of the Eel River.

According to tradition, Silver Creek was named from an incident involving stolen silver coins.

See also
List of rivers of Indiana

References

Rivers of Wabash County, Indiana
Rivers of Indiana